Monobasic may refer to:
 A monobasic or monoprotic acid, able to donate one proton per molecule
 A monobasic salt, with one hydrogen atom, with respect to the parent acid, replaced by cations 
 Monobasic, or Monotypic taxon, a taxonomic group (taxon) that contains only one immediately subordinate taxon
 Monobasic, an album by Jess Cornelius
 Mono-Basic, the implementation of Visual Basic.Net for Mono

See also

Dibasic (disambiguation)
Tribasic (disambiguation)
Polybasic (disambiguation)

Chemical nomenclature